Thiago Henrique Mendes Ribeiro (born 15 March 1992) is a Brazilian professional footballer who plays as a defensive midfielder and centre-back for Ligue 1 club Lyon.

Career

Lille
On 8 July 2017, Ligue 1 side Lille announced the signing of Mendes on a five-year contract. The transfer fee was reported as "worth up to €9 million" after being signed by manager Marcelo Bielsa.

Lyon
On 3 July 2019, Mendes signed for Ligue 1 club Lyon.

Career statistics

1.Includes Campeonato Goiano and Campeonato Paulista.

Honours
Goiás
 Campeonato Goiano: 2012, 2013
 Campeonato Brasileiro Série B: 2012
Lyon

 Coupe de la Ligue runner-up: 2019–20

References

External links 

 Profile at the Olympique Lyonnais website
 
 

1992 births
Living people
Association football midfielders
Brazilian footballers
Goiás Esporte Clube players
São Paulo FC players
Lille OSC players
Olympique Lyonnais players
Campeonato Brasileiro Série A players
Campeonato Brasileiro Série B players
Ligue 1 players
Brazilian expatriate footballers
Brazilian expatriate sportspeople in France
Expatriate footballers in France
People from São Luís, Maranhão
Sportspeople from Maranhão